is a live video by Japanese singer/songwriter Chisato Moritaka, released on July 28, 2021 by Up-Front Works. It is a compilation of three online concerts she hosted after her Kono Machi Tour 2020 was cancelled due to the COVID-19 pandemic.

The video peaked at No. 35 on Oricon's Blu-ray chart.

Overview 
The concert features Moritaka's top 10 songs, as voted by her fans online.

The concert features live performances of 20 of Moritaka's songs selected by music critic Nobuaki Onuki, plus her covers of Shonen Knife's "Banana Chips" and Negoto's "Sharp"

The concert features Moritaka's personal selection of 16 songs she did not perform in the two previous shows, plus her cover of Capsule's "More More More".

Track listing

Personnel 
 Chisato Moritaka – vocals, rhythm guitar, alto recorder

Discs 2–3
 The White Queen
 Yuichi Takahashi – guitar
 Maria Suzuki – guitar
 Yu Yamagami – keyboards
 Masafumi Yokoyama – bass
 Akira Sakamoto – drums

Charts

References

External links 
  (Chisato Moritaka)
  (Up-Front Works)

2021 live albums
2021 video albums
Chisato Moritaka video albums
Japanese-language live albums
Japanese-language video albums
Live video albums
Zetima video albums